Idhu Namma Bhoomi is a 1992 Indian Tamil-language film written directed by P. Vasu, and produced by Radha Ravi. The film stars Karthik and Khushbu. It was released on 5 June 1992. The film bombed at the box-office.

Plot 

Jeganathan, a poor man, fell in love with Nagavalli, who was from the richest family in the village and Jeganathan married her secretly. Nagavalli's father died of a heart attack and her brother Rathnavel couldn't digest this humiliation. Jeganathan then worked hard and became as rich as Rathnavel.

The two men continue to hate each other. In an auction, Rathnavel's henchmen and Jeganathan's henchmen fight and Nagavalli is severely injured. Gopi, Jeganathan's son who lives with his grandmother Periyanayaki, comes back to see his mother. Nagavalli then dies and Gopi takes the challenge to unite the two families. So Gopi decides to marry Rathnavel's daughter Nalini.

Cast 

Karthik as Gopi
Khushbu as Nalini
Vijayakumar as Jeganathan
Radha Ravi as Rathnavel
Srividya as Nagavalli (guest appearance)
Manorama as Valliammai
Napoleon as Mirasudar
S. S. Chandran as Vedachellam
Vennira Aadai Moorthy as Music College Professor
Sumithra as Suguna
Rocky as Udhayamurthy
Pandu
Vasu Vikram as Kumaravel
Rajeshkumar as Sundaravel
Harshavardhan
Uday Prakash
Gandhimathi as Periyanayaki
Oru Viral Krishna Rao
Marthandam
Thalapathi Dinesh
Shakthi Vasudevan

Soundtrack 
The soundtrack was composed by Ilaiyaraaja, with lyrics written by Vaali.

Reception 
The Indian Express wrote, "Though the script of director P. Vasu is bit old-fashioned, he has mixed all the right ingredients that go to make such movies in right proportions as a result of which this film has turned out to be a full-length entertainer".

References

External links 
 

1990s Tamil-language films
1992 films
Films directed by P. Vasu
Films scored by Ilaiyaraaja